Ballochroy is a megalithic site in Kintyre on the Argyll peninsula in Scotland.

Alexander Thom, known for his work on Stonehenge, maintained that the great length between the stones and the features of distant landscape lent precision to pinpointing the midsummer and winter solstices for ancient observers.

These three stones are considered the most spectacular set of megalithic monuments that cluster around south Argyll. It is possible that this last, smallest, stone may have been broken off at the top. The line of stones is orientated north-east to south-west.

The shortest stone also faces across the alignment, and points to Beinn a' Chaolais, the southernmost of the three Paps of Jura. The sun setting here would have given warning of the approach of the solstice.

As with many megalithic sites, the current theories concerning the exact use of the stones at Ballochroy are somewhat controversial.

See also
List of archaeoastronomical sites sorted by country

References

External links 

Archaeoastronomy
Archaeological sites in Argyll and Bute
Megalithic monuments in Scotland
Kintyre
Scheduled Ancient Monuments in Argyll and Bute